Colin Silberstein is an Israeli international lawn bowler.

Bowls career
Silberstein was selected as part of the five man team by Israel for the 2012 World Outdoor Bowls Championship in Adelaide, Australia.

He won a fours bronze medal (with Yair Bekier, Roi Ben-Ari and Allan Saitowitz) at the 2011 Atlantic Bowls Championships.

References

Israeli male bowls players
Living people
Year of birth missing (living people)